Live at Hammersmith Odeon is a 1994 live album by the British singer Kate Bush. It is a re-release of a video recording of the 1979 The Tour of Life, first released on home video in 1981, complete with a CD version of the video.

The video and CD contain twelve songs from the tour, consisting mainly of songs from The Kick Inside and Lionheart with a new song "Violin"; which would subsequently appear on Bush's third studio album Never for Ever in 1980.

In September 1979, Bush released an EP of four tracks recorded at the final dates of her only major tour, called On Stage, which reached  in the UK singles chart. The EP includes a performance of "L'Amour Looks Something Like You" which was cut from the abridged live album.

Track listing

Personnel

Musicians
The following list is taken from the tour programme. Additional personnel may be involved.

 Kate Bush - vocals, piano
 Brian Bath - electric guitar, acoustic mandolin, vocal harmonies
 Alan Murphy - electric guitar, whistle
 Paddy Bush - mandolin, vocal harmonies, additional instrumentation
 Ben Barson - synthesizer, acoustic guitar
 Kevin McAlea - piano, keyboards, saxophone, 12 string guitar
 Del Palmer - bass
 Preston Heyman - drums, percussion
 Glenys Groves and Liz Pearson - backing vocals

Production
 Kate Bush - producer
 Gordon Patterson - sound engineer, front of house
 Martin Fisher - stage sound engineer

Film crew
 Kate Bush - producer, choreography
 Keith McMillan - director
 Richard Dellow, Barrie Dodd, Jim McCutcheon, Mike Morgan, Ron Tufnell - cinematographers
 John Henshall - lighting
 Joe French - unit production manager
 Sarah King - production assistant
 Sandy Field - title design

References

Live at the Hammersmith Odeon
Live at the Hammersmith Odeon
Live at the Hammersmith Odeon Bush, Kate
1989 video albums
Live video albums
EMI Records live albums
Albums recorded at the Hammersmith Apollo